Sára Eszter Péter (born 6 July 2002) is a Hungarian artistic gymnast. She is the 2019 European Games bronze medalist on the vault.

Career 
Péter competed at the 2018 Gymnasiade where the Hungarian team of Péter, Nóra Fehér, Csenge Bácskay, Bianka Schermann, Zoja Szekely won the gold medal. Péter won the bronze medal on the vault. She competed at the 2018 European Championships alongside Noémi Makra, Dorina Böczögő, Boglárka Dévai, and Nóra Fehér. They finished 6th in the qualification round and qualified to the team final where they finished 8th. She was selected for the 2018 World Championships with Dorina Böczögő, Nóra Fehér, Zsofia Kovacs, and Noémi Makra, and they finished 17th in the team qualification round. 

At the 2019 European Championships, she finished 7th in the vault event final. At the 2019 European Games, she won the bronze medal on vault behind Teja Belak and Angelina Melnikova. She competed at the 2019 World Cup in Paris and won the silver medal on vault behind Oksana Chusovitina. She competed at the 2019 World Championships, and the Hungarian team of Péter, Zsofia Kovacs, Noémi Makra, and Bianka Schermann finished 18th.

References 

 
2002 births
Living people
Hungarian female artistic gymnasts
Gymnasts at the 2019 European Games
European Games medalists in gymnastics
Gymnasts from Budapest
European Games bronze medalists for Hungary
21st-century Hungarian women